The Parkham Yaksha is a colossal statue of a Yaksha, discovered in the area of Parkham, in the vicinity of Mathura, 22.5 kilometers south of the city. The statue, which is an important artefact of the Art of Mathura, is now visible in the Mathura Museum. It has been identified as the Yaksha deity Manibhadra, a popular deity in ancient India.

Date
The Parkham Yaksha is datable to period 200 BCE – 50 BCE on paleographic and stylistic grounds. It has also been dated more precisely by Heinrich Lüders, who gives it a mid-2nd century date, and Sonya Rhie Quintanilla who dates it to circa 150 BCE.

Inscription
The statue is 2.6 meters tall, including its base of about 30 centimeters. The badly corroded inscription in early Brahmi script on the top side of the base reads:

This inscription thus indicates that the statue represents the Yaksa Manibhadra, and the title "Bhagavat" ("Lord" or "Holy One") suggests that the statue represents a divinity in its own right, which was the subject of worship, independently of Buddhism or Jainism with which it was later associated.

Style
The analysis of the statue has suggested that the Parkham Yaksha probably held his left arm akimbo, while holding a bag filled with square coins, as seen in the Manibhadra statue of Pawaya. According to John Boardman, the hem of the dress is derived from Greek art. Describing a similar statue, John Boardman writes: "It has no local antecedents and looks most like a Greek Late Archaic mannerism". Similar folds can be seen in the Bharhut Yavana.

The Parkham Yaksha is one of four known occurrences of the Yaksha Manibhadra in inscriptions: one in Parkham near Mathura, one in Pawaya near Gwalior, one in Masharfa and one in Bhītā near Kausambi. It appears Manibhadra was considered as a protector of itinerant merchants, a provider of wealth, and a protector against smallpox.

See also
 Yaksha
 Pañcika
 Kubera

References

Sources

 

Yakshas
Mathura art
Colossal statues in India